Oreolalax sterlingae is a species of amphibian in the family Megophryidae. It is endemic to Lao Cai Province, Vietnam. It is known only from a single stream on Mount Fansipan, in Hoang Lien National Park, Lao Cai Province, Vietnam.

References

sterlingae
Amphibians of Vietnam
Endemic fauna of Vietnam
Amphibians described in 2013